The Felsenegg Tower is a broadcasting tower located nearby Felseneggbahn mountain station on the Felsenegg vantage point in the canton of Zürich in Switzerland. The tower is owned by Swisscom Broadcast AG and generally not accessible by the public.

History 
The Felsenegg Tower was built between 1959 and 1963 by architect Edwin Schoch from Zurich. Originally,  it was designed for telephone transmission and broadcasting of radio and television programs. It was officially called Albis (abbreviated ALBS) by PTT (Swiss Telecom PTT, now Swisscom)

The tower was the number one national and international (Eurovision) technical control centre for TV transmissions and later, it was the connection point of many private TV stations in Switzerland allowing to connect to the national and international TV net. The REAL system switches antennas on other 27 Swisscom-towers. Today, Felsenegg is becoming less important, as the optical fiber technology will replace microwave radio technology. Felsenegg still supplies directional radio but also FM broadcasting among them Radio Zürisee in Rapperswil. Since 2005, Skyguide maintains a radar station at the same location.

Technical data 
It has 16 floors and an underground building for technical equipment. The antennas are on the terraces of the 5 top floors and on the roof. For its directional radio system there are parabolic antennas, horn and shell antennas.

References

External links 

 Felsenegg webcams on Swisswebcams.ch

Buildings and structures in the canton of Zürich
Towers in Switzerland